There are eleven locations and sites which the Dia Art Foundation considers part of its constellation of art museums and long-term installations. Dia breaks its holdings into two distinct categories: locations and sites. "Locations" include museum structures that contain galleries of smaller works either on permanent or temporary display, while "sites" are long-term art installations placed outside of the gallery context that have been either commissioned or acquired by Dia. All three locations are found in New York state, while the eight sites are located in New York, Utah, New Mexico, and Germany. Currently one location, Dia SoHo, is scheduled to be opened in 2022, and there are seven sites that were once listed by Dia but are no longer listed.

The Dia Art Foundation was established in 1974 in New York City by the not yet married Heiner Friedrich and Schlumberger heiress Philippa de Menil, as well as Helen Winkler. They created the institution to help artists realize ambitious projects whose scale and scope is not feasible within the normal museum and gallery systems. With Friedrich and de Menil's combined large fortune, the foundation began supporting minimalist, conceptual, and land artists with, as Vanity Fair describes in an article, "stipends, studios, assistants, and archivists for the individual museums it planned to build for each of them". Beginning with a collection of warehouse spaces in New York and outdoor spaces in the American West, the foundation did not focus on constructing true museums but focused on singular artistic visions. This approach changed slightly in 1987 with the opening of Dia's first rotating exhibition space, the Dia Center for the Arts, now Dia Chelsea, on 22nd Street in New York City. Dia Beacon, a former Nabisco box factory turned into a large-scale museum for the permanent collection, opened in 2003.

The foundation began by working with and collecting the work of only twelve artists: Joseph Beuys, Walter De Maria, Dan Flavin, Donald Judd, Imi Knoebel, Blinky Palermo, Fred Sandback, James Turrell, Cy Twombly, Andy Warhol, Robert Whitman, and La Monte Young. To this day the foundation owns works by less than 50 artists, but contains a breadth and depth of their work in a way other institutions do not have the resources to maintain. Dia Director Jessica Morgan explains the relationship between Dia and its artists as, "I wouldn't use the word 'family', but these are people we're in communication with almost on a weekly basis, and in some cases we hold the vast majority of their seminal work". Known for its focus on American male minimalist, experimental, and land artists from the 1960s and 1970s, Dia's focus has been changing to include other artists from the era, largely women and Japanese artists, since Morgan became curator in 2015. This gradual refocus is markedly seen in the 2018 acquisition of Sun Tunnels by Nancy Holt, Dia's most recent addition to their list of sites.

Locations 

Dia maintains three locations all within New York State. These locations present galleries of work, either owned by or loaned to Dia, in temporary or permanent installations. Dia Chelsea, the first Dia location, was known as the Dia Center for the Arts from its opening in 1987 through the opening of Dia Beacon in 2003.

Sites

Dia lists eight sites in its catalogue. These sites include commissions, land art, long-term art installations not in a gallery context, and site-specific installations. While focused largely in New York City and the American West, there are sites also placed internationally and elsewhere in the United States. The first sites were a trio of acquisitions and commissions by Walter De Maria in 1977 and the most recently collected site is Sun Tunnels by Nancy Holt acquired in 2018.

Former sites 

 

There are multiple Dia sites, or long term installations, that were once listed in Dia publications or press releases but are no longer categorized as such. These sites were not necessarily removed from view, for instance The Dan Flavin Art Institute became part of Dia Bridgehampton and Dan Flavin's Untitled (to you, Heiner, with admiration and affection) was moved from Munich, Germany to Dia Beacon.

Future locations 
Dia has one new location planned. By renovating a retail space in the SoHo section of New York City which Dia already owns, a fourth location will be added to Dia's portfolio in 2022.

Affiliates

Alongside the 11 locations and sites Dia manages, they also maintain relationships with 6 affiliate institutions. Dia collaborated and supported these institutions, either financially or by donating or sharing of artworks, early in each origination's development. Two of the affiliates, City by Michael Heizer and Roden Crater by James Turrell, while being partially funded and supported by Dia since the 70's, are still not completed.

Notes

References

External links 
 Dia Art Foundation

Dia Art Foundation
Dia